Finite Records was a private jazz record label which released about 5 records in the late 1970s.

Drummer John Lewis is involved in 3 of the albums.  Lewis can be heard on the Strata-East Records releases The Waterbearers and Handscapes 2.

Discography

External links
Discogs

American record labels
Jazz record labels